The Metropolis of Thessaloniki is a Greek Orthodox metropolitan see based in the city of Thessaloniki in Central Macedonia, Greece. It is part of the so-called "New Lands", belonging to the jurisdiction of the Ecumenical Patriarchate of Constantinople but being administered by the Church of Greece. The see traces its history to its foundation by the Apostle Paul in the 1st century.

History
In its early centuries, the see of Thessaloniki became the metropolitan diocese of the Roman province of Macedonia. After the creation of major ecclesiastical jurisdictions, the see of Thessalonica was subordinated to the Patriarch of Rome, rising to become the archbishopric of the Eastern Illyricum. Roman control—and the use of Latin as a liturgical language—continued until , when the see was transferred to the jurisdiction of the Patriarch of Constantinople. Under Constantinople, it was reduced in status to a "simple" metropolitan see, with 5 to 12 suffragan sees, although the metropolitans continued to use the title of "archbishop" as well.

List of bishops

References

Sources
 
 
 

Christianity in Thessaloniki
Thessaloniki
Thessaloniki
1st-century establishments in the Roman Empire
1st-century establishments in Greece
Eastern Orthodox dioceses in Greece